James Scott (born 7 September 1934) is an English retired professional footballer who played as a wing half.

References

People from Hetton-le-Hole
Footballers from Tyne and Wear
English footballers
Association football defenders
Burnley F.C. players
Oldham Athletic A.F.C. players
English Football League players
1934 births
Living people